The Miserables is a short film (20 minutes) directed by Benjamin Taylor and written by Alex Lipman. 
Released in 2010 by University of Westminster, the film was a finalist at The 38th Annual Student Academy Awards in Beverly Hills, and has been screened at festivals in the UK, USA, China, Russia, Germany and Italy.  The film won Best Drama at the 2011 Royal Television Society Student Awards where the short was considered by the jury to be outstanding. A very good emotional script, had been creatively executed with sensitivity, flair, restraint, and imagination.

Plot 

Struggling to cope with his wife Evelyn's (Maggie Steed) terminal illness, Murray Pickleton (Ian Hogg) constructs time machines out of their furniture in his efforts to relive their past and escape the present.  Evelyn is skeptical, but when her doctor insists she is to be moved to a hospice, she joins her husband in remembering their life together and attempts to discuss his life after hers.

Cast 

 Maggie Steed – Evelyn Pickleton
 Ian Hogg – Murray Pickleton
 Henry Everett – Doctor
 Elizabeth Muncey – Alison
 Scott Ellis – George

Awards and nominations

Festival screenings 

In addition to receiving various awards and nominations, The Miserables has also been screened at many short film festivals around the world, including the following:
2011 – Big Sur Film Festival in California, USA. 
2011 – IULM Film Festival in Milan, Italy.
2011 – No Limits Film Festival in Sheffield, UK. 
2011 – Up and Coming Film Festival in Hannover, Germany.
2010 – VGIK International Film Festival in Moscow, Russia.

External links 

 
 Watch The Miserables

References 

2010 films
British short films
2010s English-language films